Delphyne Heymann (born 24 November 1966) is a French biathlete. She finished 6th in the 15 km at the 1992 Winter Olympics in Albertville. She became World Champion with the French team in 1993.
At the 1994 Winter Olympics in Lillehammer, she won a bronze medal with the French relay team.

References

1966 births
Living people
French female biathletes
Olympic biathletes of France
Biathletes at the 1992 Winter Olympics
Biathletes at the 1994 Winter Olympics
Biathletes at the 2002 Winter Olympics
Olympic bronze medalists for France
Olympic medalists in biathlon
Biathlon World Championships medalists
Medalists at the 1994 Winter Olympics
20th-century French women